The climate of Liverpool features a temperate maritime variety (Köppen: Cfb), with relatively mild summers, cool winters and rainfall spread fairly evenly throughout the year. Since 1867, rainfall and temperature records for the city have been kept at Bidston Observatory, as well as atmospheric pressure records since 1846. However, the site closed down in 2002, and a weather station in Crosby has been used by the Met Office since. Irregular meteorological observations have been taken in the city since at least 1768, with unbroken records extending for long periods of time. This includes observations taken at the Liverpool Dock from 1768 to 1798, an unspecified location from 1772 to 1799 and West Derby from 1830 to 1859 and at other unspecified locations in the city from at least 1860 onward. Continuous observations in different areas of the city have been taken since 1830. In modern times, there have also been other stations to operate in the Liverpool area, including stations at West Kirby (1912–1979), Aigburth (1967–1994), and Liverpool John Lennon Airport (1946–present).

On average, the amount of air frost days per year is below the national average, and in winter, snow is not very common, with heavy snow occurring rarely. Rain is also a common occurrence in the city, but droughts have been known to cause some canal infrastructure problems in the summer, without affecting consumer consumption to any noticeable extent, the most recent drought occurring in the 2018 heat wave.

Classifications

Temperature 

Averages

Extremes 
Due to Liverpool having an oceanic climate, extremes of temperatures are rare. Furthermore, being located close to the sea, wind chill is enhanced as a result of stronger winds as well as heat indexes being higher as a result of the higher humidity found close to bodies of water.

Highest averages

Lowest averages

Highest daily temperatures

Lowest daily temperatures

Precipitation 
Rainfall is fairly regular throughout the year in Liverpool, with no wet or dry season as a result of its oceanic climate. All records refer to the Bidston Observatory from 1867 to 2002 and Crosby from then on.

Averages

Extremes

Lowest

Highest

Sunshine 
Records of sunshine were kept at Bidston from 1908 to 2002. The station at Crosby does not report sunshine data.

Extremes

Highest

Lowest

Wind 

Averages

Daily Extremes
Highest wind gusts reported in each month of the year.

Monthly Extremes
Average monthly windspeed

Climatic data

Notes

References 

Climate
Climate of England
Climate by city